Ryman is a British stationery retailer.

Ryman may also refer to:
Rymań, a village in Poland
Ryman Auditorium, an American performance venue
Ryman Hospitality Properties, a diversified real estate investment trust whose holdings include the above venue
Ryman Arts, an art school
Isthmian League or Ryman League, an English football (soccer) league

People
Geoff Ryman, Canadian writer of science fiction
Herbert Ryman (1910–1989), American imagineer
John Ryman, British former Labour Party Member of Parliament
Robert Ryman (1930–2019), American minimalist artist
Tommy Ryman, stand-up comedian
Will Ryman, American artist, son of Robert Ryman